Patrick Faure (born May 12, 1946) is a French businessman. His best-known role was in motorsport, as President of Renault Sport and Renault F1 Team.

Early career and education
Faure was born in Périgueux, (Dordogne), France, but spent his youth in Paris. He had a strong relationship with his father, Maurice Faure, a former Cahors city mayor and minister of various French governments. He studied at the Lycée Louis-le-Grand. Then, he was into laws and politics before be awarded with a place in the École Nationale d’Administration. He graduated in 1972 and worked three years as a civil administrator of the Caisse des Dépôts et Consignations. In 1975, he moved to the private sector and joined the precision engineering company Labinal. In 1977, he became Chairman of Gelbon.

Renault
In 1977, he was hired by Renault as Toulouse’s regional manager. After that, he took over the sales department. He increased his importance within Renault’s structure with the years, and he was manager of Renault Austria (1981) and Renault UK (1982). In 1985, he was named head of the Public Affairs and Corporate Communications Department. In January 1986 he was appointed member of Renault’s board of directors and President of Renault Sport. The motorsport company was in complex situation, and Faure decided to end the Renault’s Formula One involvement. Then, he ordered to Bernard Dudot to develop a new 3.5-litre normally aspirated engine. When the turbos were banned, Renault returned to Grand Prix racing. In 1988, he was named Secretary General for the Renault Group. In 1991, he was officially appointed chairman and CEO of Renault Sport. In 1998, he became chairman and CEO of Renault VI. In 2001, he was named Executive Vice President of Renault and President of Renault F1 Team. In late 2004 he left the Renault’s board of directors. Since January, 2005, he concentred his efforts on the Renault team. On April 3, 2006, he was replaced by Alain Dassas.

Beyond Renault
Since 1993 he has been a member of Vinci SA’s Board of Directors. His appointment ends in 2013. He is also a member of the Board of Directors of Cofiroute, a motorways' concessionaire which is owned by Vinci. He held several appointments in other companies, such as chairman of the Board of Directors of Ertico, Chairman of the Association France-Amériques, Director of ESL & Network and of Waterslim Luxembourg.

On October 10, 2006, the nuclear energy company Areva, sponsor of the French team for the 2007 America’s Cup, hired Faure as a project consultant, because of his experience to organise large sport operations. He remains as a company’s consultant but is now retired.

References

Living people
1946 births
People from Périgueux
Sportspeople from Dordogne
Renault people
Formula One people
French motorsport people
École nationale d'administration alumni